Ada Cambridge (21 November 1844 – 19 July 1926), later known as Ada Cross, was an English-born Australian writer. She wrote more than 25 works of fiction, three volumes of poetry and two autobiographical works. Many of her novels were serialised in Australian newspapers but never published in book form. While she was known to friends and family by her married name, Ada Cross, her newspaper readers knew her as A.C. She later reverted to her maiden name, Ada Cambridge, and that is how she is known today.

Life
Ada was born at St Germans, Norfolk, the second child of Thomasine and Henry Cambridge, a gentleman farmer. She was educated by governesses, an experience she abhorred. She wrote in a book of reminiscences: "I can truthfully affirm that I never learned anything which would now be considered worth learning until I had done with them all and started foraging for myself. I did have a few months of boarding-school at the end, and went to sex school school for its day it was, but it left no lasting impression on my mind." (The Retrospect, Chapter IV). It was, in fact, an unmarried aunt who contributed most to her intellectual development.

On 25 April 1870, she married the Rev. George Frederick Cross and a few weeks later sailed for Australia. She arrived in Melbourne in August and was surprised to find it a well-established city. Her husband was sent to Wangaratta, then to Yackandandah (1872), Ballan (1874), Coleraine (1877), Bendigo (1884) and Beechworth (1885), where they remained until 1893. Her Thirty Years in Australia (1903) describes their experiences in these parishes. She experienced her share of tragedy, including the loss of children to whooping cough and scarlet fever.

Cross at first was the typical hard-working wife of a country clergyman, taking part in all the activities of the parish and incidentally making her own children's clothes. Her health, however, broke down, for a number of reasons, including a near-fatal miscarriage and a serious carriage accident, and her activities had to be reduced, but she continued to write.

In 1893, Cross and her husband moved to their last parish, Williamstown, near Melbourne, and remained there until 1909. Her husband went on the retired clergy list at the end of 1909 with permission to operate in the diocese until 1912. In 1913 they both returned to England, where they stayed until his death on 27 February 1917. Ada returned to Australia later that year, and died in Melbourne on 19 July 1926. She was survived by a daughter and a son, Dr K. Stuart Cross.

Career
While Cambridge began writing in the 1870s to make money to help support her children, her formal published career spans from 1865 with Hymns on the Litany and The Two Surplices, to 1922 with an article "Nightfall" in Atlantic Monthly. According to Barton, her early works "contain the seeds of her lifelong insistence on and pursuit of physical, spiritual and moral integrity, as well as the interweaving of poetry and prose which was to typify her writing career." Cato  writes that "some of her ideas were considered daring and even a little improper for a clergyman's wife. She touches on extramarital affairs and the physical bondage of wives."

In 1875, her first novel, Up the Murray, appeared in the Australasian, but was not published separately. It was not until 1890, with the publication of A Marked Man, that her fame as a writer was established. However, despite regular good reviews, there were many who discounted her because she did not write in the literary tradition of the time, one that was largely non-urban and masculine, that focused on survival against the harsh environment.

She was first president of the Women Writers Club and an honorary life-member of the Lyceum Club of Melbourne. Her many friends in the literary world included Grace "Jennings" Carmichael, Rolf Boldrewood, Ethel Turner, and George Robertson.

Legacy
The Ada Cambridge Prizes were first awarded in 2005. There are now four such prizes: the Ada Cambridge Biographical Prose Prize, the Ada Cambridge Poetry Prize, the Young Adas Short Story Prize, and the Young Adas Graphic Short Story Prize. These all carry a cash component and winners are announced at the Williamstown Literary Festival each year.

Cambridge Street in the Canberra suburb of Cook is named after her.

Selected works
Novels
The Two Surplices (1865)
My Guardian : A Story of the Fen Country (1874)
Up the Murray (1875)
In Two Years Time (1879)
Dinah (1880)
A Mere Chance (1880)
Missed in the Crowd (1882)
A Girl's Ideal (1882)
Across the Grain (1882)
The Three Miss Kings (1883)
A Marriage Ceremony (1884)
A Little Minx (1885)
Against the Rules (1886)
A Black Sheep (1889)
A Woman's Friendship (1889) (Serialised in the Age, 1889; first published in book form in 1988)
 A Marked Man (1890)
Not All in Vain (1891)
Fidelis (1895)
A Humble Enterprise (1896)
Materfamilias (1898)
Path and Goal (1900)
The Devastators (1901)
Sisters (1904)
A Platonic Friendship (1905)
A Happy Marriage (1906)
The Eternal Feminine (1907)
The Making of Rachel Rowe (1914)

Poetry collections
Hymns on the Litany (1865)
Hymns on the Holy Communion (1866)
Echoes (1869)
The Manor House and Other Poems (1875)
Unspoken Thoughts (1887)
The Hand in the Dark and Other Poems (1913)

Short story collections
The Vicar's Guest : A Tale (1869)
At Midnight and Other Stories (1897)

Children's fiction
Little Jenny (1867)

Autobiography
Thirty Years in Australia (1903)
The Retrospect (1912)

References

Bibliography

Ada Cambridge (1844–1926)  Gravesite at Brighton General Cemetery (Vic)
Barton, Patricia (1988) 'Ada Cambridge: Writing for her Life' in Adelaide, Debra (1988) A Bright and Fiery Troop: Australian Women Writers of the Nineteenth Century, Ringwood, Penguin
Cato, Nancy (1989) 'Introduction' in Cambridge, Ada (1989) Sisters (Penguin Australian Women's Library)
Morrison, Elizabeth (1988) 'Editor's introduction' in Cambridge, Ada (1988) A woman's friendship (Colonial Text Series)
Roe, J.I. (2006) 'Cambridge, Ada (1844–1926)', Australian Dictionary of Biography, Online Edition http://www.adb.online.anu.edu.au/biogs/A030310b.htm

AustLit author entry.

External links

Ada Cambridge contains the text of three of her sonnets.
Cordula's Web features selected poems from Ada Cambridge.
manybooks.net offers free PDF formatted works by Ada Cambridge.
SETIS contains free PDF formatted works and print works for purchase by Ada Cambridge.
Williamstown Literary Festival contains details of stories shortlisted for, and winners of, the 'Ada Cambridge Writers Prize' in 2008 and 2009.

119 poems featured at the Australian Poetry Library.
 Ada Cambridge Poems List

1844 births
1926 deaths
People from King's Lynn and West Norfolk (district)
English women novelists
English women poets
19th-century Australian novelists
20th-century Australian novelists
Australian memoirists
Australian women novelists
Australian women poets
Victorian women writers
19th-century English women writers
19th-century English writers
20th-century English women writers
20th-century English writers
19th-century Australian women
20th-century Australian women
English emigrants to colonial Australia